The Davidson Automobile Battery armored car was a further development of the Davidson-Duryea gun carriage, but with steam power. It was built by  Royal Page Davidson and the cadets of the Northwestern Military and Naval Academy in Highland Park, Illinois. Davidson designed this vehicle in 1901. He and his students at the Northwestern Military and Naval Academy built two of these partially armored military vehicles. They were armed with Colt .30 caliber machine guns.  The vehicles were powered by a tubular steam boiler. They had difficulty in going up hills because of changes of the water level in the boiler. Davidson made these lightly armored military vehicles of one thousand pounds at the Academy campus in Highland Park, Illinois. These two partially armored military vehicles were labeled No. 1 and No. 2. Presently No. 2 is at the Chicago Museum of Science and Industry.

The Peoria Rubber and Motor Vehicle Manufacturing Company in Peoria, Illinois manufactured Davidson's armored military vehicles. They built them from the patent specifications of Charles Duryea of the Duryea Motor Wagon Company. The Automobile Battery armored vehicle front steam boiler is connected to a six-horsepower Duryea Motor Wagon Company three-cylinder steam engine. The front bulletproof shield to protect the driver was detachable. There was a vertical opening in the metal shield surrounding the machine gun. The machine guns on the vehicles could fire 480 shots a minute, rotate 180 degrees, and had a firing range of 2000 yards.

The Davidson Automobile Battery armored vehicle’s fuel tank and engine were covered with armor and a metal bulletproof removable shield added to the front to protect the passengers. Davidson had his cadets add the Colt automatic machine gun as part of the School's Manual Training Department's program. The military vehicle was intended to be a scout car. These prototypes that Davidson with his cadets manufactured were never produced commercially, however they would become the armored car as we know it today as well as the armored tank used in modern warfare. It is the forerunner of today's anti-aircraft gun carriers. The curved front body section had a Colt machine gun mounted on top for the front passenger to use, while the driver drove the military vehicle. There was cargo space available underneath the carriage of the armored vehicle. The Davidson Automobile Battery partially armored vehicle was further developed to the first fully armored vehicle in the U.S.

References

Sources

 American men of mark (1917), A Thousand American Men of Mark Today
 Clemens, Al J., The American Military Armored Car,  A.J. Clemens, 1969
 Clymer, Joseph Floyd et al., Treasury of Early American Automobiles, 1877–1925, McGraw-Hill (1950)
 Delta Upsilon fraternity (1902), The Delta Upsilon Decennial Catalogue [1903]
 Hunnicutt, R.P., Armored Car: A History of American Wheeled Combat Vehicle, Presidio Press (2002), 
 Kane, Joseph Nathan, Famous First Facts - A Record of First Happenings, Discoveries and Inventions in the United States, The H. W. Wilson Company (1950)
 Marquis-Who's Who (1950), Who was who in America. 1943-1950, New Providence, New Jersey
 Marquis-Who's Who (1967), Who was who in America: A Companion Biographical Reference Work to Who's who in America
 Quaife, Milo Milton, Wisconsin: Its History and Its People 1634-1924, Volume 4, S.J. Clarke Publishing Company (1924)
 Randall, Frank Alfred, Randall and Allied Families, Raveret-Weber printing company (1943)
 St. John's Military Academy, A History of Excellence: St. John's Northwestern Military Academy, Delafield, Wis., self-published (2002)
 Stern, Philip Van Doren, A Pictorial History of the Automobile: As Seen in Motor Magazine 1903-1953, Viking Press (1953)
 Tucker, Spencer, Tanks: An Illustrated History of Their Impact, 
 Willcox, Cornélis De Witt, The International Military Digest Annual: A Review of the Current Literature of Military Science for 1915-1918, Cumulative Digest Corporation (1916)

External links
 Armored car Chronology
 Charles Duryea gun carriage patent
 Davidson Auto Battery Armored Car with image
 Duryea automobiles with Davidson-Duryea gun carriages

Armoured fighting vehicles before World War I
Armoured cars of the United States